Slide Lake may mean:

Lakes
Slide Lake (Idaho), a glacial lake in Elmore County, Idaho
Slide Lake (Montana), a lake in Glacier National Park, Montana
Lower Slide Lake, a lake in Teton County, Wyoming
Rock Slide Lake, a glacial lake in Boise County, Idaho

Other
Slide Lake-Otatso Creek Patrol Cabin and Woodshed, a group of rustic buildings in Glacier National Park, Montana

See also